Samuel McDaniel (born 9 December 1995) is an Australian professional basketball player for the Hobart Chargers of the NBL1 South. He played college basketball for Southeastern Community College and Louisiana–Monroe.

Early life
Born in Hobart, Tasmania, McDaniel grew up in Adelaide, South Australia, and attended Southern Vales Christian College in the suburb of Morphett Vale. He played in the Central ABL for the Southern Tigers between 2012 and 2014.

College career
Between 2014 and 2016, McDaniel played college basketball for Southeastern Community College. He averaged 13 points and 8.2 rebounds during his sophomore year.

For his junior season, McDaniel transferred to Louisiana–Monroe. In 65 games over two seasons, he averaged 13.2 points, 6.0 rebounds and 1.8 assists for the Warhawks.

Professional career
In May 2018, McDaniel joined the Mount Gambier Pioneers of the South East Australian Basketball League (SEABL). In eight games, he averaged 16.9 points, 7.0 rebounds, 2.3 assists and 1.5 steals per game.

In August 2018, McDaniel joined Melbourne United as a development player for the 2018–19 NBL season. He appeared in 12 games during the season.

After playing for the Sandringham Sabres during the 2019 NBL1 season, McDaniel re-joined United for the 2019–20 NBL season as a fully contracted player. He averaged 1.4 points in 19 games.

In August 2020, McDaniel re-signed with United for the 2020–21 NBL season. He played a key role on the defensive end during the season and helped Melbourne win the championship.

On 1 July 2021, McDaniel signed a three-year deal with the Tasmania JackJumpers, a franchise entering the NBL for the first time in 2021–22. Following the NBL season, he joined the Hobart Chargers of the NBL1 South and helped them win the 2022 championship while earning grand final MVP honours.

In the 2022–23 NBL season, McDaniel appeared in 14 games for the JackJumpers. Following the season, he declined the player option on his contract. He then re-joined the Chargers for the 2023 NBL1 South season.

Personal life
McDaniel's father, Wayne McDaniel, also played in the NBL for the Adelaide 36ers, Geelong Supercats, Newcastle Falcons and Hobart Devils.

References

External links
NBL profile

1995 births
Living people
Australian men's basketball players
Australian expatriate basketball people in the United States
Louisiana–Monroe Warhawks men's basketball players
Melbourne United players
Shooting guards
Small forwards
Tasmania JackJumpers players